Hyman Garshin Landau (December 18, 1909 – December 2, 1966), more often known as H. G. Landau, was an American mathematical biologist, statistician and sociologist who is known for using mathematical methods such as graph theory to understand animal behavior and social dynamics. After receiving his doctorate in statistics from the University of Pittsburgh, he worked at the Ballistic Research Laboratory at Aberdeen Proving Ground, Maryland, while teaching part-time at the University of Delaware. He carried out his seminal work at the University of Chicago on graph tournaments. Later, he moved to Columbia University after being forced to leave Chicago by the House Un-American Activities Committee.

References

External links

 American Mathematical Society feature column on graph tournament

1909 births
1966 deaths
American statisticians
People from Kielce County
Carnegie Mellon University alumni
University of Pittsburgh alumni
Theoretical biologists